The  (Simply called as "Denshi Manga Juku") is a touchscreen handheld game console developed by Bandai and released in Japan on 1995 during the fifth generation of video game consoles.

Overview
On March 3, 1995 Bandai released a new portable gaming console geared towards children. It was called the Bandai Design Master Denshi Mangajuku (電子 漫画 塾), the first touch screen console ever created.

Nine cartridges were made for the system, although only eight were released to retail and that four of them are considered as games, with the rest being made in the design/manga carts which contained various licensed characters you can use representations of in the actual games by piggy-backing the design carts onto a game cart. The games themselves are mostly basic and were either basic RPG battle games, or simple drawing programs.

On August 4, 2020, the video game preservation group "Gaming Alexandria" announced that they made dumps and scans of the system and all of its nine available cartridges before then in a period of November 2019 to February 2020.

Games
 Bishoujo Senshi Sailor Moon SS Illustration Club
 Dragon Ball Z Taisen-gata Search Battle
 Dungeon Diver
 From TV Animation Slam Dunk
 Rockman X3 Buster Battle
 Super Street Fighter 2
 Weekly Shonen Jump Special

References

External links
 Database entry at The Video Game Kraken (Accurately compiled website)

Handheld game consoles
Fifth-generation video game consoles
Bandai consoles